State Highway 105 (SH 105) is a state highway that runs partially from I-25 in Monument to SH 67 (Manhart Avenue) in Sedalia. The highway serves the communities of Monument and Palmer Lake and the unincorporated areas of Douglas and El Paso counties.  Several former sections have been deleted from the state highway system since its inception, thus leading to north and south sections of the current highway.

Route description

SH 105 consists of two segments as it is no longer a continuous highway. It interchanges Interstate 25 and then loops around Monument. It then begins a northern trajectory and enters Palmer Lake. After exiting Palmer Lake, the road continues as Spruce Mountain Road and SH 105 then heads due north, and ending at the Douglas County/El Paso County Line, continuing as County Road 105. The highway then enters Sedalia and terminates at a junction with SH 67 (Manhart Avenue), facing East Plum Creek.

History
The route was established in the 1920s, when it connected U.S. Highway 87, now Interstate 25, to Sedalia. By 1963, the road was deleted from Palmer Lake to Interstate 25 and the road was paved to its entirety. The road was extended to replace SH 50 (now deleted) due to confusion with U.S. Highway 50. A section from SH 83 to I-25 was deleted in October 2007.

Major intersections

References

External links

Colorado Routes 100-119 The Highways of Colorado

105
Transportation in El Paso County, Colorado
Transportation in Douglas County, Colorado